Wisa Wisa (Aymara wisa first born twin, Quechua wiksa, wisa belly, the reduplication indicates that there is a group or a complex of something, Hispanicized spelling Visa Visa) is a mountain in the Andes of Peru, about  high. It is situated in the Puno Region, Lampa Province, Vilavila District, and in the Melgar Province, Ayaviri District. Wisa Wisa lies near the mountains Pukarani (Pucarani) in the northwest and Wallatani (Huallatane) in the southeast, southwest of a place called Wisa Wisa (Huisa Huisa).

References

Mountains of Peru
Mountains of Puno Region